Corniche Jjilienne is a natural region of northern Algeria characterised by rocky forested massifs rising above the coastal plain. The forested areas provide some of the last extant habitat for the endangered Barbary macaque, Macaca sylvanus; this primate prehistorically had a much wider distribution in North Africa than at present.

See also
 Jijel

References
 Berardo Cori and Enrica Lemmi. 2002. Spatial Dynamics of Mediterranean Coastal Regions: An International HDP-oriented Research, Human Dimensions of Global Environmental Change Programme, Published by Patron, .  444 pages

Line notes

Geography of Algeria
Natural regions of Africa